William Babington may refer to:
 William Babington (academic), Vice-Chancellor of Oxford University, 1441–1443
 William Babington (justice) (c. 1370–1454), English lawyer and judge
 William Babington (physician) (1756–1833), Anglo-Irish physician and mineralogist
 William Babington (East India Company officer), Anglo-Irish officer

See also
 W. B. Maxwell (William Babington Maxwell, 1866–1938), British novelist
 William Babbington, fictional Royal Navy captain in the novels of Patrick O'Brian